The red-eye effect in photography is the common appearance of red pupils in color photographs of the eyes of humans and several other animals. It occurs when using a photographic flash that is very close to the camera lens (as with most compact cameras) in ambient low light.

Causes 

In flash photography the light of the flash occurs too fast for the pupil to close, so much of the very bright light from the flash passes into the eye through the pupil, reflects off the fundus at the back of the eyeball and out through the pupil. The camera records this reflected light. The main cause of the red color is the ample amount of blood in the choroid which nourishes the back of the eye and is behind the retina. The blood in the retinal circulation is far less than in the choroid, and plays virtually no role. The eye contains several photostable pigments that all absorb in the short wavelength region, and hence contribute somewhat to the red eye effect. The lens cuts off deep blue and violet light, below 430 nm (depending on age), and macular pigment absorbs between 400 and 500 nm, but this pigment is located exclusively in the tiny fovea. Melanin, located in the retinal pigment epithelium (RPE) and the choroid, shows a gradually increasing absorption towards the short wavelengths. But blood is the main determinant of the red color, because it is completely transparent at long wavelengths and abruptly starts absorbing at 600 nm. The amount of red light emerging from the pupil depends on the amount of melanin in the layers behind the retina. This amount varies strongly between individuals. Light-skinned people with blue eyes have relatively low melanin in the fundus and thus show a much stronger red-eye effect than dark-skinned people with brown eyes.

The same holds for animals. The color of the iris itself is of virtually no importance for the red-eye effect. This is obvious because the red-eye effect is most apparent when photographing dark-adapted subjects, hence with fully dilated pupils. Photographs taken with infrared light through night vision devices always show very bright pupils because, in the dark, the pupils are fully dilated and the infrared light is not absorbed by any ocular pigment.

The role of melanin in red-eye effect is demonstrated in animals with heterochromia: only the blue eye displays the effect. The effect is still more pronounced in humans and animals with albinism. All forms of albinism involve abnormal production and/or deposition of melanin.

Red-eye effect is seen in photographs of children also because children's eyes have more rapid dark adaptation: in low light a child's pupils enlarge sooner, and an enlarged pupil accentuates the red-eye effect.

Theatrical followspot operators, positioned nearly coincidentally with a very bright light and somewhat distant from the actors, occasionally witness red-eye in actors on stage. The effect is not visible to the rest of the audience because it is reliant on the very small angle between the followspot operator and the light.

Similar effects 
Similar effects, some related to red-eye effect, are of several kinds:

 In many flash photographs, even those without perceptible red-eye effect, the tapetum lucidum of many animals' pupils creates an "eyeshine" effect. Although eyeshine is an unrelated phenomenon, animals with blue eyes may display the red-eye effect in addition to it.
 A related effect, red reflex, is seen in fundoscopy; here, the reflected red light is directly visible through the ophthalmoscope.
 In photographs recorded with infrared-sensitive passive (non-IR emitting) equipment, the eyes (not only the pupils) usually appear very bright. This is due not to reflection, but to radiation of core body heat in the form of infrared light (see Night vision).

Photography techniques for prevention and removal 

The red-eye effect can be prevented in a number of ways:
 Using bounce flash in which the flash head is aimed at a nearby pale colored surface such as a ceiling or wall or at a specialist photographic reflector. This both changes the direction of the flash and ensures that only diffused flash light enters the eye.
 Placing the flash away from the camera's optical axis ensures that the light from the flash hits the eye at an oblique angle. The light enters the eye in a direction away from the optical axis of the camera and is refocused by the eye lens back along the same axis. Because of this the retina will not be visible to the camera and the eyes will appear natural.
 Taking pictures without flash by increasing the ambient lighting, opening the lens aperture, using a faster film or detector, or reducing the shutter speed.
 Using the red-eye reduction capabilities built into many modern cameras. These precede the main flash with a series of short, low-power flashes, or a continuous piercing bright light triggering the pupil to contract. (This should not be confused with some autofocus assist beams, which use a series of flashes for focus instead.)
 Having the subject look away from the camera lens.
 Increase the lighting in the room so that the subject's pupils are more constricted.

If direct flash must be used, a good rule of thumb is to separate the flash from the lens by 1/20 of the distance of the camera to the subject. For example, if the subject is 2 meters (6 feet) away, the flash head should be at least 10 cm (4 inches) away from the lens.

Professional photographers prefer to use ambient light or indirect flash, as the red-eye reduction system does not always prevent red eyes — for example, if people look away during the pre-flash. In addition, people do not look natural with small pupils, direct lighting from close to the camera lens is considered to produce unflattering photographs, and pre-flashes can be distracting or annoying.

Red-eye removal is built into many popular consumer graphics editing software packages, or is supported through red-eye reduction plug-ins; examples include Adobe Lightroom, Adobe Photoshop, Apple iPhoto, Corel Photo-Paint, GIMP, Google Picasa, Paint.NET and Microsoft Windows Photo Gallery. Some can automatically find eyes in the image and perform color correction, and can apply it to many photos at once. Others may require the operator to manually select the regions of the pupils to which correction is to be applied. When performed manually, correction may consist of simply converting the red area of pupils to grayscale (desaturating), leaving surface reflections and highlights intact.

As a medical warning sign 
In a photograph of a child's face, if there is red-eye in one eye but not the other, it may be leukocoria, which may be caused by the cancer retinoblastoma. The child's eyes should be examined by a general physician.

References 

Eye
Science of photography